Revelation Lyrics is the name of the first album from El Roockie. The album was released in November 1999.

References

1999 debut albums
El Roockie albums